is a Japanese politician of the New Komeito Party, a member of the House of Councillors in the Diet (national legislature). A native of Kamikawa (Teshio) District, Hokkaidō and graduate of Sapporo Medical University, he was elected for the first time in 1992.

References

External links 
  in Japanese.

Members of the House of Councillors (Japan)
Living people
1947 births
New Komeito politicians